The Stearns Collection of Musical Instruments, held by the University of Michigan's School of Music, Theatre & Dance in Ann Arbor, Michigan, consists of over 2,500 historical and contemporary musical instruments from around the world. The basis of the Collection is a gift made to the University by pharmaceutical businessman Frederick Stearns in 1898.  Known internationally as a unique research collection, its holdings include the trumpet collection of Armando Ghitalla, former principal trumpet player of the Boston Symphony Orchestra and University of Michigan faculty member; a collection of violin bows from Jerry Tetewsky; as well as Robert Moog's first commercially produced Moog synthesizer from 1964 and the RCA theremin used during the WXYZ broadcasts of the Green Hornet from 1936-1952.  A Catalog documenting the Collection's holdings was published in 1918  by Albert A. Stanley, with a second edition published in 1921.  In 1988, Professor James M. Borders published a catalog featuring the Collection's European and American wind and percussion instruments.

The museum's collections include a number of forged or altered items, purchased by the founder from the notorious Italian instrument dealer Leopoldo Franciolini. The museum's web site and signage are unusual among musical instrument museums for the scrupulous care with which these items are identified.

The collection is exhibited in the lower lobby of the University's Hill Auditorium on the Central Campus and at the Earl V. Moore Building on the North Campus.

See also 
 List of music museums

References

External links 

 The Stearns Collection Website, The University of Michigan - Ann Arbor
 Digitized 1918 Catalogue of the Stearns Collection
 Digitized 1921 Catalogue of the Stearns Collection
 "In the Stearns Collection, forgotten musical artifacts find a home", Michigan Daily, October 4, 2009.
 "The Baroque Recorders in the Stearns Collection of Musical Instruments", The Galpin Society Journal, August 1970.
 BobMoog.com  Stearns Collection Home to First Commercial Moog

Museums in Ann Arbor, Michigan
Musical instrument museums in the United States
Music museums in Michigan
University museums in Michigan
University of Michigan
1898 establishments in Michigan